Bruce R. (Robert) Berkowitz is an American equity fund manager and registered investment adviser. Berkowitz founded Fairholme Capital Management in 1997 and was formerly a senior portfolio manager at Lehman Brothers Holdings and a managing director of Smith Barney.  Berkowitz was named 2009 Domestic-Stock Fund Manager of the Year and Domestic-Stock Fund Manager of the Decade by Morningstar, Inc.

Early life and education
Berkowitz, was raised in Chelsea, Massachusetts, the son of Hennie (née Schneider) and Barney Berkowitz. His father was a part-time taxi driver and owned a convenience store; his mother was a homemaker. Berkowitz attended Chelsea High School and Huntington Prep before graduating from Beaver Country Day School. In 1980, he graduated with a bachelor's degree in economics, cum laude, from the University of Massachusetts Amherst.

Career
After college, Berkowitz worked at the Strategic Planning Institute, a management consulting firm, in Cambridge, Massachusetts. In 1983, he joined Merrill Lynch in London. In 1986 he accepted a job with Lehman Brothers in London and then transferred to their New Jersey office in 1989 as a senior portfolio manager. In 1993, he became a managing director of Smith Barney Investment Advisers.
 
In 1997, Berkowitz started his own firm, Fairholme Capital Management. The name of the firm "Fairholme" was the name of the last street on which he had lived.

In late 2010 it was announced that Berkowitz had joined the board of directors of the St. Joe Company.

Philanthropy
Berkowitz donated $6.75 million to the Center for Jewish History which is dedicated to the preservation of Jewish history and genealogy. His donation along with that of Bill Ackman, the CEO of hedge fund Pershing Square Capital Management, and Joseph Steinberg, the president of Leucadia National, were the three largest individual gifts that the center has ever received.

Personal life
Berkowitz lives in Coral Gables, Florida. He has been married to Tracey (née Pellows) Berkowitz since 1980, and he has two sons and one daughter.

References

External links
Fairholme Funds
Fairholme Capital Management (archive)

Year of birth missing (living people)
Place of birth missing (living people)
Living people
American financial businesspeople
American money managers
American financial analysts
American hedge fund managers
Jewish American philanthropists
People from Coral Gables, Florida
People from Chelsea, Massachusetts
Beaver Country Day School alumni
University of Massachusetts Amherst alumni
21st-century American Jews